Børselva is a river in Porsanger Municipality in Troms og Finnmark county, Norway.

This area has three productive salmon rivers, the other two being Lakselva (which literally means the salmon river) and Stabburselva.

The Børselva river runs through the Silfar canyon where the water is emerald green in colour and crystal clear. That is one of the deepest canyons in Europe.

References

Rivers of Troms og Finnmark
Porsanger
Rivers of Norway